Jebel Sudan Mountain is part of the Wurga mountain range, located northwest of the Republic of Tunisia in the state of Kef. The Mountain is located at Coordinates 36°16'N 8°23'E in the northwest of the Republic of Tunisia, north of the town of Saqiet Sidi Youssef. It is only 1,500 meters away from the border with Algeria. The height of the summit is 980m.

References

Mountains of Tunisia